Loïc Caradec (1948–1986) was a French engineer, born in Paris. He died in the 1986 Route du Rhum race.

Caradec sailed in the 1973–74 Whitbread Round the World Race on Grand Louis and in the 1977–78 Whitbread Round the World Race on Gauloises II.

References

1948 births
1986 deaths
20th-century French engineers
French male sailors (sport)
Sportspeople from Paris
Single-handed sailors
French people of Breton descent
Volvo Ocean Race sailors